The 1989–90 FC Bayern Munich season was the 90th season in the club's history and 25th season since promotion from Regionalliga Süd in 1965.  Bayern won its 11th Bundesliga title.  The club also reached the third round of the DFB-Pokal and the semifinals of the European Cup.  Bayern finished as runner-up in the DFB-Supercup losing to Borussia Dortmund.

Results

Friendlies

Fuji-Cup

Teresa Herrera Trophy

Xerox Super Soccer

Bundesliga

Results by round

League standings

DFB Pokal

DFB-Supercup

European Cup

1st round

2nd round

Quarter-finals

Semi-finals

Team statistics

Players

Squad, appearances and goals

|}

Bookings

Team kit

Transfers

In

Out

References

FC Bayern Munich seasons
Bayern
German football championship-winning seasons